Piccaninnie Ponds Conservation Park, formerly the Piccaninnie Ponds National Park, is a protected area of   located in southeastern South Australia near Mount Gambier.

Description

The conservation park conserves a wetland fed by freshwater springs in a karst landscape.

It is close to the border with Victoria and is part of the Discovery Bay to Piccaninnie Ponds Important Bird Area, identified by BirdLife International as being of global significance for several bird species. It is a listed Ramsar site. The park contains a walking track through coastal woodland to a viewing platform overlooking the wetlands.

Recreational diving
Piccaninnie Ponds is a popular site for both snorkelling and cave diving. In 1964–1965, prior to its proclamation as a national park in 1969, underwater explorer Valerie Taylor described the ponds as "one of the most beautiful sights in Australia" and said that the crystal clear water gave her a feeling of unhindered flight. It contains three main features of interest to cave divers. Underwater visibility is excellent and may exceed . Snorkelling and cave diving at Piccaninnie Ponds is by permit only.

Accidents 
Several divers have died while exploring the caves beneath Piccaninnie Ponds, in 1972, 1974 and 1984.

Flora and fauna 
The pond contains various species of native plants, freshwater fish, eels and shrimp.

See also

References

Further reading
Horne, P.; (1985), CDAA Research Group Report No. 3: Piccaninnie Ponds Mapping Project, November 1984 – April 1985 OCLC: 27574762.
 Horne, P; and Harris, R.; (2009),  Piccaninnie Ponds Collaborative Research Project: Exploration and General Research Activities, May/June 2008 and Oct/Nov 2009 (with South Australian Department of Water, Land and Biodiversity Conservation (DWLBC) and the South Australian Department for Environment and Heritage (DEH)).

External links
 Piccaninnie Ponds Conservation Park official webpage
 Ponds Conservation Park Diving and Snorkelling Guidelines (PDF download)
Piccaninnie Ponds Conservation Park webpage on protected planet

Conservation parks of South Australia
Protected areas established in 1969
1969 establishments in Australia
Limestone Coast
Sinkholes of Australia
Underwater diving sites in Australia
Ramsar sites in Australia